The obsolete medical terms Mongolian idiocy and Mongolism referred to a specific type of mental deficiency, associated with the genetic disorder now known as Down syndrome. The obsolete term for a person with this syndrome was Mongolian idiot.

In the 21st century, these terms are no longer used as medical terminology, deemed an unacceptable, offensive and misleading description of those with Down's syndrome. The terminology change was brought about both by scientific and medical experts, as well as people of Asian ancestry, including those from Mongolia.

The stand-alone term "idiot" itself has a similar history of meaning and connotation change.

"Idiot" as a former technical term

While the term "idiot" is, in the present day, not used in a medical, legal or psychiatric context, instead meaning a stupid or foolish person, the term previously held meaning as a technical term used in both legal and psychiatric contexts for some type of profound intellectual disability, wherein the disabled person's mental age was considered to be two years or less. Along with terms like "moron", "imbecile", and "cretin", "idiot" has become an archaic description in legal, medical and psychiatric contexts, becoming instead an offensive term deemed outdated and discriminatory towards those it was once used to describe.

The term was gradually replaced with "profound mental retardation", which has since experienced euphemistic evolution and been gradually replaced with other terms.

History
John Langdon Down first characterized the syndrome that now bears his name as a distinguishable form of mental disability in 1862, and in a more widely published report in 1866. Due to his perception that children with Down's syndrome shared facial similarities with the populations that German physician Johann Friedrich Blumenbach described as the "Mongolian race", Down used the term "mongoloid" in his characterisation of those with Down's syndrome.

The term continued its usage into the 20th century, with a study published in 1908 by W. Bertram Hill bearing the name Mongolism and its Pathology. The term "mongolism" was used by English psychiatrist and geneticist Lionel Penrose as late as 1961.

F. G. Crookshank published a pseudoscientific book in 1924 named The Mongol in our Midst which suggested that the syndrome was due to genetic traits literally inherited from Mongoloid races.

Rock band Devo released a song titled "Mongoloid" in 1977, describing a man with Down Syndrome.

Deprecation and depreciation of the term
In 1961, genetic experts wrote a joint letter to the medical journal The Lancet which read:

In 1965, WHO resolved to abandon the term at the request of the Mongolian People's Republic. Despite decades of inaction to change the term and resistance to abandoning it, the term thereafter began to fade from use, in favor of its replacement, Down's Syndrome, Down syndrome and Trisomy 21 disorder.

However, the term "Mongolian idiocy" was reported as continuing in use at least 15 years after the WHO's decision to abandon it; in his book The Panda's Thumb, published in 1980, paleontologist Stephen Jay Gould reported that the term "mongolism" was still commonly used in the United States, despite being "defamatory" and "wrong on all counts".

References

Down syndrome
Obsolete medical terms